Bahria Town (Private) Limited is an Islamabad-based privately owned real-estate development company which owns, develops and manages properties across Pakistan.

It established its first gated community exclusively developed for the elites in Islamabad but it also accommodate middle-class income families. Its second gated community opened in Lahore, which is influenced by Greco-Roman culture and is built in southern Lahore. In 2015, it launched the Bahria Town Karachi, the largest of its gated communities, while Bahria Enclave Islamabad (launched in 2013) is the smallest of them. Combined, its projects have the capacity to house over a million people.

The companies subsidiary's include the Mall of Lahore and the under-construction Mall of Islamabad, a chain of cinemas under the brand of Cine Gold, a chain of supermarkets under the banner of Green Valley Hypermarket and skyscrapers including the Bahria Icon Tower, which is the tallest in Pakistan. The group also is the developer of Grand Jamia Mosque, Lahore, which is the seventh largest in the world and is constructing the third largest mosque in Karachi. The under-construction Rafi Cricket Stadium, when completed, will also be the largest in the country. In November 2016, Bahria entered into a contract with Hyatt to develop four properties across Pakistan, including two golf resorts, worth combined $600 million. The properties would be owned by Bahria.

ACE International Academy is also a project of Bahria Town. 
Bahria projects usually house upper middle and high income Pakistanis, these communities have private security, ability to restrict access to non-residents and are energy independent from the national grid. Bahria gated communities are home to private schools including those operated by the company, private hospitals, hotels, and commercial avenues. Bahria has been featured by international news agencies.

Communities

Bahria Town Islamabad
Rudn Enclave The original project, the gated community has over 100,000 people and has series of projects. It is divided into various phases and smaller projects. Unlike other housing societies in Pakistan, Bahria produces its own electricity and sells it to its resident through the Bahria Town Electric Supply Company. Bahria Town projects in Islamabad and Lahore were running respectively 12 and 9 megawatts of generation units of their own. Bahria Town also has constructed 3 grid stations with its own resources and also provides underground lines to its residents. Along with DHA, It houses Top 1% of 200 million Pakistani Elite, thus there is no load shedding in Bahria Town projects.

Bahria Enclave
Bahria Enclave is a housing scheme launched by Bahria Town in July 2011. It is located approximately 8 km (15 minutes) drive from Chak Shahzad, the Park Road & the Kuri Road with access from Srinagar Highway, Lehtrar Road, and Islamabad Highway. On January 31, 2012, Capital Development Authority approved the plan for development of Jinnah Avenue in Zone-IV. The construction project of four-lane road would link main Kuri Road to Kuri Model Village and was awarded to Bahria Town.

Bahria Town Lahore

It is a flagship gated community in Lahore. The community is home to the Grand Jamia Mosque, Lahore which is the seventh largest mosque in the world which has a total capacity of 70,000 people.

Bahria Town Karachi

Bahria Town Peshawar
Bahria Town Peshawar is a currently constructed privately owned gated community of Peshawar, Khyber Pakhtunkhwa, Pakistan.  It was originally going to be launched in January 2020, 

The location of Bahria Town Peshawar is to be located at Charsadda Road Peshawar near the M-2 Expressway.  Bahria Town will be acquiring 100,000 kanals of land.

Bahria Town's CEO Malik Riaz said the purpose for building a Bahria Town in Peshawar is to be provide better homes for the residents of Peshawar and is to be the first one in the region.  On his Twitter, he said "it was time to deliver yet again" and asked the residents of Peshawar to "get ready".

 Gated Community
 Security and CCTV Surveillance
 Extensive and carpeted road structure
 Basic amenities (water, gas, electricity, sewerage system etc.)
 Educational Institutes
 Commercial Areas
 New Grand Jamia Masjid
 Theme Park
 Parks
 etc.

Shopping malls

Skyscrapers

Hospitality
On November 14, 2016, Hyatt Hotels Corporation and Bahria Town Group entered into agreement in Abu Dhabi to develop four properties in Pakistan worth over $600 million. All properties are under-construction as of 2016.

Recognition and awards
After success at national level, Bahria has been featured by international magazines and news agencies, referred to as the prosperous face of Pakistan. According to Emirates 24/7, Bahria Town is "where Pakistan's new middle class takes refuge from the Taliban attacks and endless power cuts that plague the rest of the country". GlobalPost claimed that in 2013, Bahria houses some 100,000 people in total. Newsweek calls it as Pakistan's "Gateway to Paradise". On October 6, 2011, Los Angeles Times refereed Bahria as "functioning state within a non-functioning one". Regardless of that Bahria has been subject to controversies, it is referred to as a symbol of inequality, blamed for illegal encroachment of forests and unholy alliance with military.

Controversies
Bahria has been subject to controversies, it is referred to as a symbol of inequality and blamed for illegal encroachment of forests.

To begin with, the name 'Bahria' itself has been controversial and in 2018 a senior court in Pakistan ruled against the use of this name by the private owners of the project.
Ayesha Siddiqa, a civilian military analyst and author of Military Inc.: Inside Pakistan's Military Economy, alleges that those links have allowed him to acquire land, in some cases returning a percentage to senior officers as developed plots.
Chief Executive of Bahria Town, Ali Riaz Malik, has submitted his statement regarding Arsalan Iftikhar (son of Chief Justice of Pakistan Iftikhar Muhammad Chaudhry) suo moto case in the Supreme Court of Pakistan that Bahria Town was not behind any allegations against Arsalan and that the court's proceedings were not aimed at investigating the affairs of Bahria Town. The written reply also said that if any statement were made against Bahria Town or against its administration, then the organisation would have the right to respond to it.

In April 2016, Malik Riaz Hussain's son, Ahmed Ali Riaz Malik, was named in the Panama Papers.

Dispute with Nayatel and CCP fine 
In August 2016, a complaint from a resident of Bahria Town was forwarded to the Competition Commission of Pakistan (CCP) which revealed that Bahria Town was deliberately preventing other fixed-line service providers from expanding into Bahria Town, and thus giving PTCL the majority of the market share in the housing society, it was also in violation of the Competition Act (2010) by abusing its dominant position and entering into a prohibited agreement.

Six months later, CCP imposed a fine on Bahria Town of 2 million PKR for deliberately not issuing a NOC (No-Objection Certificate) to Nayatel in Phases 1 to 6.

Bahria Town has been directed to work with Nayatel to lay down its fiber optic cable network in Phases 1 to 6.

See also 
List of largest companies in Pakistan
 Developments in Islamabad

References

External links
 Official website

 
Real estate companies of Pakistan
Construction and civil engineering companies of Pakistan
Construction and civil engineering companies established in 1997
Real estate companies established in 1997
Pakistani companies established in 1997